College Grove may refer to:
 College Grove Methodist Church
 College Grove Shopping Center, San Diego
 College Grove (sports ground), a multi sport facility in the UK
 College Grove, Tennessee
 College Grove, Western Australia